Wybren Jan Buma (1910–1999) was a scholar of Frisian languages and history, known for editing and translating Germanic law codes including the Asega-bôk (his was the first modern scholarly edition thereof), the legal code for the Rustringian Frisians and one of the oldest surviving continental Germanic law codes.

References

Reference bibliography

 
 
 
 

Germanic studies scholars
1910 births
1999 deaths